This is a list of notable Juniata College alumni, in order of graduation year.

J. E. Keeny, prior to 1889, President of Louisiana Tech University 1908–1926
Carl Henry Hoffman, 1922, Republican Congressman from Pennsylvania
Quinn McNemar, 1925, psychologist and statistician
Francis Harvey Green, 1931, Chair of English at West Chester University, Headmaster of Pennington School
Jack E. Myers, Ph.D., 1934, Professor Emeritus, University of Texas; one of six Juniata alumni members of the National Academy of Sciences; and 1998 recipient of the Society's highest honor - The Founders Award
Gene E. Sease, Ph.D., 1952, Chairman, Sease Gerig & Associates, Indianapolis, Ind. President Emeritusm, University of Indianapolis
Chuck Knox, 1954, former National Football League head coach, Los Angeles Rams, Buffalo Bills and Seattle Seahawks, also the NFL's fifth winningest coach
Harriet Smith Windsor, 1962, Secretary of State for the State of Delaware from 2001 to 2009
Peter Marzio, 1965, former director of Museum of Fine Arts, Houston
William Phillips, 1970, atomic physicist, National Institute of Standards and Technology, jointly awarded Nobel Prize in 1997 for advancing basic knowledge and new techniques to chill atoms to extremely low temperatures.
Mary White, 1973, President and CEO of the Swedish Medical Center in Denver, Colorado
Renee D. Diehl, 1976, Professor of Physics, Penn State University; Awardee, Fulbright Fellowship, 2007; Winner, Outstanding Service Award from the Women in the Sciences and Engineering (WISE) Institute at Penn State, 2006
John Kuriyan, 1980, 2005 winner of the Lounsbery Award for extraordinary scientific achievement, Howard Hughes Investigator and Chancellor's Professor of Biochemistry & Molecular Biology at the University of California Berkeley.
Stephanie L. Haines, 1992, Judge of the United States District Court for the Western District of Pennsylvania
Ayinde Alakoye, 1994, CEO, Hitch Radio/ Board Member, created the mobile app that Clear Channel turned into iHeartRadio, Application Developers Alliance/ Contributing Speech Writer, Obama for America (2008)

References

Juniata College
Juniata College people